OPLAN 1003–98 was the United States Armed Forces's pre-2002 contingency plan in event of a war with Iraq. It originally called for 500,000 troops for the invasion and control of Iraq.

Tommy Franks' American Soldier gives extensive details of the replanning process that led to the final "Hybrid" plan for the 2003 invasion of Iraq.

Sources
 http://www.commondreams.org/views02/1110-06.htm
 http://www.gwu.edu/~nsarchiv/NSAEBB/NSAEBB207/index.htm
 http://www.nybooks.com/articles/19197

United States Department of Defense plans